Ireland–Yugoslavia relations were historical foreign relations between Republic of Ireland and now defunct Socialist Federal Republic of Yugoslavia. During the Cold War both Ireland and Yugoslavia refused to formally join either the NATO or Warsaw Pact military alliances with Ireland's claim of military neutrality and post-1948 Tito-Stalin split Yugoslavia focusing on diplomatic relations within the Non-Aligned Movement. During the Informbiro period Yugoslavia indirectly associated itself with NATO via the Balkan Pact (1953).

History

1920s to 1950
The Irish revolutionary period attracted significant media attention in the Kingdom of Yugoslavia, particularly in Belgrade and Zagreb. It influenced parliamentary debates and the Croat autonomists movement which led to the creation of the Banovina Croatia.

In 1946, the Parliament of Ireland discussed the case of Alojzije Stepinac on two occasions, and adopted a Resolution on Religious Freedom which called on the Minister of Foreign Affairs to share information on the Stepinac case.

1955 friendly soccer game incident
In 1955, one year after Yugoslavia defeated England in Belgrade, the Football Association of Ireland organized a friendly soccer game with Yugoslavia at Dalymount Park. The Roman Catholic archbishop of Dublin John Charles McQuaid, supported by various government ministers and senior civil servants, called for the cancellation of the game quoting ″continued persecution of the Catholic Church in communist Yugoslavia″ and especially the case of Alojzije Stepinac, which had inspired earlier mass protests in Ireland. The Irish national broadcasting service Raidió Teilifís Éireann declined to cover the game after its main sports commentator Phil Greene pulled out of the broadcast. As the game went ahead and was attended by 21,400 fans it was interpreted by many as a public protest against conservatisms and excessive influence of the Catholic Church in Ireland in public life.

From 1960
In 1967, Radio Television Belgrade recorded a documentary on daily life in Ireland which was presented to audiences in the Socialist Republic of Serbia.

The two countries cancelled their mutual visa requirements in reciprocity in 1974, and formal diplomatic relations were established in 1977. In 1980 President Patrick Hillery,Tánaiste George Colley along with Ruairí Ó Brádaigh of Sinn Féin, Andy Barr of the Communist Party of Ireland and Billy McKee of the Provisional Irish Republican Army all attended the state funeral of President Josip Broz Tito.

Following the breakup of Yugoslavia, Irish judge Maureen Harding Clark served at the International Criminal Tribunal for the former Yugoslavia.

See also
Yugoslavia–European Communities relations
Croatia–Ireland relations
Ireland–Kosovo relations
Yugoslavia in the Eurovision Song Contest 1971
Yugoslavia in the Eurovision Song Contest 1988
Ireland in the Eurovision Song Contest 1990

References

Ireland
Yugoslavia
Bosnia and Herzegovina–Ireland relations
Croatia–Ireland relations
Ireland–Kosovo relations
Ireland–Serbia relations
Ireland–Slovenia relations